Firefox for Android is a web browser developed by Mozilla for Android smartphones and tablet computers. As with its desktop version, it uses the Gecko layout engine, and supports features such as synchronization with Firefox Sync, and add-ons.

The initial version of Firefox for Android was codenamed Fennec and branded Firefox for mobile; it initially supported Maemo and Android before supporting MeeGo and Firefox OS as well. Support for Maemo was later dropped. In 2020, a redesigned version of Firefox for Android (codenamed Fenix, and also branded as Firefox Daylight) was released, which introduced a new internal architecture and user interface inspired by Firefox Focus, new privacy features, and switching to curated WebExtensions for add-ons.

History 
Firefox for mobile, codenamed "Fennec", was first released for Maemo in January 2010 with version 1.0 and for Android in March 2011 with version 4.0. Support for Maemo was discontinued after version 7, released in September 2011. The codename Fennec comes from the fennec fox, a small desert fox (just as the Fennec browser is a small version of the Firefox desktop browser). Firefox for Maemo Beta 5, released in 2009, was the first version to have the official Firefox branding, with the Firefox name and logo.

Fennec uses the Gecko engine; for example, version 1.0 used the same engine as Firefox 3.6, and the following release, 4.0, shared core code with Firefox 4.0. Its features include HTML5 support, Firefox Sync, add-ons support and tabbed browsing. The browser's version numbering was bumped from version 2.0 beta to version 4.0 to more closely match desktop releases of Firefox since the rendering engines used in both browsers are the same.

Plugin support was initially disabled by default, removing compatibility with popular web content types such as Adobe Flash. In September 2011, Flash support was implemented in pre-release builds for pre-Honeycomb versions of Android. Flash support for Android 2.x and 4.x was enabled for most smartphones in version 14.0; later it was removed in version 56.0.

On June 27, 2019, Mozilla unveiled Firefox Preview (codename "Fenix"), a redesigned version of Firefox for Android based on GeckoView an implementation of Gecko that is decoupled as a reusable library, intended to be used as an alternative to the default Android WebView component (based on Blink engine). GeckoView was first used by Firefox Focus, whose design influenced aspects of Fenix.  It has a redesigned user interface with support for dark mode, a new "Collections" feature for saving sets of tabs, and includes Enhanced Tracking Protection (a configurable blocker for web trackers and third-party cookies) and a redesigned private browsing mode.

The Firefox for Android Beta channel was migrated to the Fenix branch in April 2020, and it was officially released to the stable channel in August 2020 as version 79, branded as Firefox Daylight. The last Fennec-based version was version 68, which was released in July 2019, and received bug and security fixes until July 2020.

Add-ons 

Firefox for Android allows installation of extensions. Firefox Daylight/"Fenix" uses the same WebExtensions architecture as the desktop version of Firefox, but not all APIs are supported.

Firefox for Android supports a limited number of Add-ons, which include uBlock Origin, Privacy Badger, Firefox Relay, AdNauseum, Tampermonkey and more. Manifest V3 support is planned for Firefox for Android and will be added sometime in 2023.

As of September 29, 2020, the Nightly branch contains an experimental function for installing extensions via the Mozilla Add-ons website, which is intended for testing compatibility.

Platforms 
Firefox Daylight requires Android 5.0 "Lollipop" or later; earlier versions of Firefox also supported earlier versions of Android. Support for Android devices that run x86 processors was added in December 2013.

Previously or unofficially supported 
Previously, Firefox for mobile supported other platforms besides Android.

Official support for the Nokia N900 Maemo device ceased with version 7.

Firefox mobile was available for MeeGo through the third-party OpenRepos repository. For operating systems not supported by Fennec, like Sailfish OS (based on Mer project), web browsers can use embedlite (IPCLiteAPI), a lightweight embedding API.

An alpha build of version 1.1 (1.1 Alpha 1) for Windows Mobile, released on February 19, 2010, is the last build for this operating system. Following the Windows Phone 7 announcement and Microsoft's decision not to release a native development kit, as with Android and other systems, development for Windows Mobile was put on hold. If Microsoft releases a native development kit in the future for its Windows Phone OS, then Mozilla will consider again developing Fennec for the platform.

Tristan Nitot, president of Mozilla Europe, has said that it's unlikely that a BlackBerry OS version will be released, citing BlackBerry's limited operating system as the reason. Mozilla has no plans to develop Firefox for the Symbian platform, or webOS. An unofficial port to WebOS was made, but is no longer maintained as of 2011.

An unofficial port is available for the Pandora handheld console.

Firefox 52.0.2 was the last version to run on ARM devices without NEON support, such as those with Tegra 2.

Reception 

The main criticisms of the browser pre-version 14 were slow browsing speed, lack of plugin support and performance issues. To address these concerns, Mozilla redesigned the browser in version 14.0, adding Flash support, improving start-up speed, as well as other enhancements. This update dramatically improved Firefox for Android. , the average user rating of Firefox for Android on the Google Play Store is 4.4.

Compared to the stock Android browser and Chrome on Android, Firefox has a small market share; for the month of November 2015, Firefox for Android usage share of all mobile/tablet browsers was just 0.81%. Despite that, Firefox for Android enjoys a high Play Store rating, has over 100 million downloads, and continues to be developed. The latest version supports Android 4.0 and higher (as Android 2.3 support was dropped in version 48).

In its 2015 Android browser comparison, Spanish software news and reviews site Softonic.com awarded Firefox version 37.0.1 the Best of 2015 nod, with reviewer Fabrizio Benedetti citing a good design, efficient memory consumption, the browser's open source nature, and independence.

In August 2020, Mozilla released a major update of Firefox for Android, version 79, which had been in development for more than 1 year with the codename "Firefox Daylight". It was described by Mozilla as being "dramatically redesigned to be faster, easy to use, customizable and private". However, it received intense criticism from users, who complained that it was more difficult to use, and slower, and various features were suddenly missing. Some online Tech Writers even recommended people to disable the update if possible.

Security advantages 
A number of devices run older versions of Android. Some would not be upgraded to newer versions because of insufficient technical knowledge by users, or their lack of access to mobile data; some devices cannot be upgraded because of low system resources, or the manufacturer and telecoms operator have failed to provide an update.

As of early 2015, Google has stopped issuing its own patches for Android 4.3 and earlier to the WebView browser component and the WebKit rendering engine therein, which are used by the native/stock and often default AOSP browser in a large number of Android devicesthereby shifting the patching responsibility to device manufacturers. In time, the native browser or browser components become outdated, increasingly insecure, and unable to properly render modern websites.

As a workaround, a Google engineer suggested using the separately-installable and updateable Google Chrome or Firefox browsers. In case of Ice Cream Sandwich (4.0.x), Google stopped supporting that branch of Android with updates to its Chrome browser after Chrome 43, and moved up to Android 4.1 as the oldest release supported by Google Chrome.

The open-source nature of Firefox has made it possible to maintain its development for operating system versions that are past their product support life cycle, and has resulted in Firefox having stronger security and better support for modern web standards. This in effect extends the useful lifetime of devices stuck on older major versions of Android.

Forks and code reuse

Adblock Browser 
On 20 May 2015, Eyeo GmbH, the maintainers of Adblock Plus, released Adblock Browser 1.0 beta, which is based on Firefox for Android. The browser uses a similar blocking/permitting model as Adblock Plus, allowing by default ads deemed "acceptable" by Eyeo. A major drawback compared to Firefox for Android is Adblock Browser's lack of support for Firefox Sync.

Initial reviews have been mixed: On one hand, users would be happy to have less ads and resource consumption on their devices; on the other hand, web services, publications, content creators and bloggers rely on advertisements for their revenue and income.

Adblock Browser 1.0 was released on 7 September 2015. It's compatible with Android 2.3 or greater, and has about the same system requirements as Firefox for Android.

Fennec F-Droid 
Fennec F-Droid's goal is to remove all proprietary binaries from Firefox; some proprietary binaries, however, still remained in the app. The Fennec F-Droid app is hosted in the open-source F-Droid app repository since 1 February 2015 beginning with version 35.0. Since September 2020, it is based on Fenix despite still being named "Fennec F-Droid".

IceCatMobile 

GNU maintains a fork of the latest long-term (so-called "ESR") version of Firefox for Android, with all proprietary binaries removed. As of September 2020 there is no IceCatMobile version of the new Fenix browser.

Orfox 
On 30 June 2015, The Guardian Project announced a stable alpha of Orfox, the new mobile counterpart of the Tor Browser. Orfox is built from Fennec (Firefox for Android) code and the Tor Browser code repository, and is given security hardening patches by the Tor Browser development team. Some of the Orfox build work is based on the Fennec F-Droid project.

The project removed in Orfox the WebRTC component and Chromecast connectivity, and app permissions to access the camera, microphone, contacts (address book), location data (GPS et al.), and NFC. Orfox is to supersede the Orweb browser project, which used the WebView engine.

On 3 September 2019, both The Guardian Project and The Tor Project announced that Orfox had seen its final release and that Orfox had effectively become Tor Browser for Android.

LibreOffice 

Firefox for Android (Fennec)'s front-end code was taken as a base for the new development in the LibreOffice project for Android (along with the pre-existing cross-platform LibreOffice document engine). Further work made that Fennec code the core component of LibreOffice Viewer for Android, which was released on 28 May 2015 for Android 4.0 or newer.

Release history 
Release dates:

 Version 1: January 28, 2010. For Maemo.
 Version 4: March 29, 2011. For Android and Maemo; version number matched with the desktop version.
 Version 5: June 21, 2011. For Android, supports Android 2.0 and higher.
 Version 6: August 16, 2011.
 Version 6.0.1: August 30, 2011.
 Version 6.0.2: September 6, 2011. Last version for Android 2.0.
 Version 7.0: September 27, 2011. Supports Android 2.1 and higher.
 Version 7.0.1: September 30, 2011. Last version for Maemo.
 Version 8.0: November 8, 2011.
 Version 9.0: December 21, 2011.
 Version 10.0: January 31, 2012.
 Version 10.0.1: February 10, 2012.
 Version 10.0.2: February 17, 2012. Last mobile version available for desktop systems.
 Version 10.0.3: March 13, 2012.
 Version 10.0.4: April 24, 2012.
 Version 10.0.5: June 5, 2012.
 Version 14.0: June 26, 2012, version number matched with the desktop version, first version to support Adobe Flash.
 Version 15.0: August 28, 2012.
 Version 15.0.1: September 10, 2012.
 Version 16.0: October 9, 2012.
 Version 16.0.1: October 11, 2012.
 Version 17: November 19, 2012.
 Version 18: January 8, 2013.
 Version 18.0.2: February 7, 2013.
 Version 19.0: February 19, 2013.
 Version 19.0.2: March 7, 2013. Last version to support Android 2.1. 
 Version 20.0: April 2, 2013. Supports Android 2.2 or newer.
 Version 20.0.1: April 11, 2013.
 Version 21.0: May 14, 2013.
 Version 22.0: June 25, 2013.
 Version 23.0: August 6, 2013.
 Version 24.0: September 17, 2013.
 Version 25.0: October 29, 2013.
 Version 25.0.1: November 15, 2013.
 Version 26.0: December 10, 2013.
 Version 26.0.1: December 20, 2013.
 Version 27.0: February 4, 2014.
 Version 28.0: March 18, 2014.
 Version 28.0.1: March 24, 2014.
 Version 29.0: April 29, 2014.
 Version 29.0.1: May 9, 2014.
 Version 30.0: June 10, 2014.
 Version 31.0: July 22, 2014. Last version to support Android 2.2 and the ARMv6 chipset; security updates were released through January 2015.
 Version 32.0: September 2, 2014, added support for Firefox OS.
 Version 32.0.1: September 10, 2014.
 Version 32.0.3: September 24, 2014.
 Version 33.0: October 13, 2014.
 Version 33.1: November 10, 2014, celebrating Firefox's 10-year Anniversary.
 Version 34.0: December 1, 2014.
 Version 34.0.1: December 19, 2014.
 Version 35.0: January 13, 2015.
 Version 35.0.1: February 5, 2015.
 Version 36.0: February 27, 2015.
 Version 36.0.1: March 6, 2015.
 Version 36.0.2: March 16, 2015.
 Version 36.0.3: March 20, 2015.
 Version 36.0.4: March 21, 2015.
 Version 37.0: March 31, 2015. Split releases between API levels for Android 2.3 / 3.0 and newer.
 Version 37.0.1: April 3, 2015.
 Version 37.0.2: April 14, 2015.
 Version 38.0: May 12, 2015.
 Version 38.0.5: June 2, 2015.
 Version 39.0: July 2, 2015.
 Version 40.0: August 11, 2015.
 Version 40.0.3: August 27, 2015.
 Version 41.0: September 22, 2015.
 Version 41.0.2: October 15, 2015.
 Version 42.0: November 3, 2015.
 Version 43.0: December 15, 2015. Last version to support cookie prompting (via extension).
 Version 44.0: January 26, 2016.
 Version 44.0.2: February 11, 2016.
 Version 45.0: March 8, 2016.
 Version 45.0.1: March 16, 2016.
 Version 45.0.2: April 11, 2016. Last version to support Android 3.x.
 Version 46.0: April 26, 2016.
 Version 46.0.1: May 3, 2016.
 Version 47.0: June 7, 2016. Last version to support Android 2.3.x.
 Version 48.0: August 2, 2016.
 Version 49.0: September 20, 2016.
 Version 49.0.2: October 20, 2016.
 Version 50.0: November 15, 2016.
 Version 50.0.2: November 30, 2016.
 Version 50.1.0: December 13, 2016.
 Version 51.0: January 24, 2017.
 Version 51.0.2: February 6, 2017.
 Version 51.0.3: February 9, 2017.
 Version 52.0: March 7, 2017.
 Version 52.0.1: March 17, 2017.
 Version 52.0.2: March 28, 2017.
 Version 53.0: April 19, 2017.
 Version 53.0.1: April 27, 2017.
 Version 53.0.2: May 5, 2017.
 Version 54.0: June 13, 2017.
 Version 54.0.1: June 29, 2017.
 Version 55.0: August 8, 2017.
 Version 55.0.2: August 16, 2017. Last version to support Android 4.0.x and Adobe Flash.
 Version 56.0: September 28, 2017. Last version to support legacy extensions.
 Version 57.0: November 14, 2017. First version based on Quantum project.
 Version 57.0.1: November 29, 2017.
 Version 57.0.4: January 4, 2018.
 Version 58.0: January 23, 2018.
 Version 58.0.1: January 29, 2018.
 Version 58.0.2: February 7, 2018.
 Version 59.0: March 13, 2018.
 Version 59.0.1: March 16, 2018.
 Version 59.0.2: March 26, 2018.
 Version 60.0: May 9, 2018.
 Version 60.0.1: May 16, 2018.
 Version 60.0.2: June 6, 2018.
 Version 61.0: June 26, 2018.
 Version 61.0.2: August 8, 2018.
 Version 62.0: September 5, 2018.
 Version 62.0.1: September 7, 2018.
 Version 62.0.2: September 21, 2018.
 Version 62.0.3: October 2, 2018.
 Version 63.0: October 23, 2018.
 Version 63.0.2: November 7, 2018.
 Version 64.0.1: December 14, 2018.
 Version 64.0.2: January 9, 2019.
 Version 65.0: January 29, 2019.
 Version 65.0.1: February 12, 2019.
 Version 66.0: March 19, 2019.
 Version 66.0.1: March 22, 2019.
 Version 66.0.2: March 27, 2019.
 Version 66.0.4: May 5, 2019.
 Version 66.0.5: May 7, 2019.
 Version 67.0: May 21, 2019.
 Version 67.0.2: June 11, 2019.
 Version 67.0.3: June 18, 2019.
 Version 68.0: July 9, 2019.
 Version 68.0.2: August 14, 2019.
 Version 68.1: September 3, 2019.
 Version 68.1.1: September 13, 2019.
 Version 68.2.0: October 22, 2019.
 Version 68.2.1: November 13, 2019.
 Version 68.3.0: December 3, 2019.
 Version 68.4.0: January 7, 2020.
 Version 68.4.1: January 8, 2020.
 Version 68.4.2: January 20, 2020.
 Version 68.5.0: February 11, 2020.
 Version 68.6.0: March 10, 2020.
 Version 68.7.0: April 7, 2020.
 Version 68.8.0: May 5, 2020.
 Version 68.8.1: May 11, 2020.
 Version 68.9.0: June 2, 2020.
 Version 68.10.0: June 30, 2020.
 Version 68.10.1: July 7, 2020.
 Version 68.11.0: July 27, 2020. Last version to support Android 4.1–4.4, also the last version to display the about:config page in consumer releases.
 Version 79.0: August 27, 2020. First version based on GeckoView engine. New extension framework. about:config is available only in Nightly releases.
 Version 80.0: August 31, 2020.
 Version 81.0: September 22, 2020.
 Version 82.0: October 20, 2020.
 Version 83.0: November 17, 2020.
 Version 84.0: December 15, 2020.
 Version 85.0: January 26, 2021.
 Version 86.0: February 23, 2021.
 Version 87.0: March 23, 2021.
 Version 88.0: April 19, 2021.
 Version 89.0: June 1, 2021.
 Version 90.0: July 13, 2021.
 Version 91.0: August 10, 2021.
 Version 92.0: September 7, 2021.
 Version 93.0: October 5, 2021.
 Version 94.0: November 2, 2021.
 Version 95.0: December 7, 2021.
 Version 96.0: January 11, 2022.
 Version 97.0: February 8, 2022.
 Version 98.0: March 8, 2022.
 Version 99.0: April 5, 2022.
 Version 100.0: May 3, 2022.
 Version 101.0: May 31, 2022.
 Version 102.0: June 28, 2022.
 Version 103.0: July 26, 2022.
 Version 104.0: August 23, 2022.
 Version 105.0: September 20, 2022.
 Version 106.0: October 18, 2022.
 Version 107.0: November 15, 2022.
 Version 108.0: December 13, 2022.
 Version 109.0: January 17, 2023.
 Version 110.0: February 14, 2023.
 Version 111.0: March 14, 2023.

See also 
 Firefox for iOS – version of Firefox for the mobile operating system iOS
 Firefox Focus – a privacy-focused mobile web browser
 Firefox Lite – a lightweight version of Firefox for Android.
 Firefox – Mozilla's web browser for desktop computers
 Google Chrome for Android – the default web browser for most Android devices
 Minimo – a previous project to create a mobile Mozilla browser
 MicroB – a Mozilla-based mobile browser for Nokia Maemo
 Mobile browser

References

External links 

 Mobile mozilla wiki page
 Fennec mozilla wiki page
 Firefox Browser for Android on Mozilla servers
 

Gopher clients
Firefox
Mobile web browsers
Windows Mobile Standard software
Pocket PC software
Gecko-based software
Android web browsers
Software that uses XUL